Iskhak Khasan-ulu, better known as Pulat Khan, was briefly the Khan of Kokand and one of the leaders of the Kokand rebellion that took place from 1873 to 1876.

Biography 
He was born as Iskhak Hasn-ulu to a Kirgiz tribe in Kishtak Okhna, Margilan in 1844. He studied at madrasas until he dropped out in 1867.

Dissatisfied with Khudayar Khan's policies, he sent a delegation to speak to Pulat Bey, the grandson of Alim Khan, who lived in a Samarkand madrasa, to convince him to start an uprising against Khudayar. Pulat Bey refused repeated attempts to convince him otherwise. The delegation, having failed, instead, convinced Iskhak to impersonate the actual Pulat Bey and simply to lead the uprising himself, in which he would declare himself Khan.

After assembling an army, Iskhak's army managed to takeover Kokand from Nasruddin Khan, who was proclaimed Khan after Khudayar fled to Tashkent after an uprising on 22 July 1875.

He was captured and hanged by Russian troops in 1876 for killing twelve Russian soldiers.

References

Khans of Kokand
1844 births
1876 deaths
People executed by the Russian Empire by hanging
People from Margilan